The 2010 AMA National Speedway Championship Series . The title was won by Billy Janniro, his second in total.

Event format 
Over the course of 12 elimination races, 20 heats each rider raced against every other rider once.  The riders get placed in a main event according to their earned points.

The Final Classification

References 

AMA
United States
Speed
Speed